Thomas Graeme Nelson Haldane, known as Graeme Haldane (14 December 1897 – 24 June 1981), was a Scottish engineer.

He was the son of Sir William Haldane and his wife Edith Nelson.  He was a nephew of Elizabeth Haldane, Richard Burdon Haldane, 1st Viscount Haldane and John Scott Haldane.

He was educated at Royal Naval College, Osborne and Royal Naval College, Dartmouth and in the First World War served in the Royal Navy on HM Ships Doris Valiant and Tiger. He was present at the Battle of Jutland.

In 1919 he went to Trinity College, Cambridge and worked at the Cavendish Laboratory under Rutherford.  He helped establish the National Grid.

In 1928 he joined Merz and McLellan engineering firm, and in 1941 became a partner.  In 1948 he was President of the Institution of Electrical Engineers and won its James Watt Gold Medal in 1953.  He retired in 1972.

He had a son named Richard W. Haldane.

Honours
In 2021 he was inducted into the Scottish Engineering Hall of Fame.

References

External links
The Papers of Thomas Graeme Nelson Haldane held at Churchill Archives Centre
Thomas Graeme Nelson Haldane – Dreadnought project

1897 births
1981 deaths
Alumni of Trinity College, Cambridge
Graeme
Members of the Fabian Society
People educated at the Royal Naval College, Osborne
20th-century Scottish engineers
Scottish Engineering Hall of Fame inductees
Royal Navy officers of World War I
Graduates of Britannia Royal Naval College